Kohneh Rudposht (also Romanized as Kohneh Rūdposht) is a village in Rudboneh Rural District, Rudboneh District, Lahijan County, Gilan Province, Iran. At the 2006 census, its population was 381, in 131 families.

References 

Populated places in Lahijan County